Bredia is a genus of plants in the family Melastomataceae. Species in this genus are characterized by papery leaf texture and persistent and enlarged ovary crown, enclosing an inverted frustum-shaped depression at capsule top. This genus includes at least 21 species, 15 distributed in mainland China, one in north Vietnam, five in Taiwan and one extending to the Ryukyu Islands.

The members of the group are generally herbs, shrublets or herbs, erect, ascending or creeping. Stamens 8, unequal or subequal; filaments filiform; anthers dimorphic or isomorphic, subulate to oblong-linear, gibbose, tuberculate or spurred at base, rarely unappendaged abaxially. Capsule turbinate to cup-shaped, more or less 4-sided, crown persistent and enlarged, enclosing an inverted frustum-shaped depression at capsule apex. Seed numerous, minute, cuneate, densely granulate.

Species and varieties

References 

Melastomataceae
Taxa named by Carl Ludwig Blume
Melastomataceae genera